Bertin Quentin, called the elder (1690–1767) was a French classical violinist and composer.

Biography 
Bertin Quentin called the elder, brother of Jean-Baptiste Quentin, called the young, started in 1706 as a violinist at the Académie royale de musique (later Paris Opera). In 1713, after having participated in the "Grand Chœur", he played just behind Michel-Richard de Lalande at the second desk of the first violins. After the departure of a certain Jacques Buret, he became bass violin player with Les Vingt-quatre Violons du Roi in 1720. In 1749 he retired and settled in Ermont where he died. In 1764 his name disappeared from the Royal Academy's pension list.

Bertin Quentin left us a book of "10 Sonatas for the Violin Alone and for the Flute with Continuous Basso" which was on sale among others chez l'auteur rue St. Martin vis-à-vis la fontaine Maubué

External links 

1690 births
1767 deaths
18th-century French male classical violinists
French Baroque composers
17th-century male musicians